Rocco Pozzi (died c. 1780), was an Italian painter and engraver of the Baroque period, active around 1750.

Biography
He was the brother of Stefano Pozzi. He engraved several of the plates for the Museo Florentino, and 
executed prints for the Antiquities of Herculaneum published in Naples. He became court engraver to the King of Naples, and died about 1780. His great-grandson who shares his name was the former commissioner of the Westchester County Department of Corrections in Westchester County, New York and is the current Westchester County Probation Commissioner.

Works
Pozzi drawings appear in a 1757 publication by Ottavio Antonio Bayardi.

See also
Camillo Paderni

References

1700 births
1780 deaths
18th-century Italian painters
Italian male painters
Italian engravers
Italian Baroque painters
18th-century Italian male artists